Mary Louise Petty (January 4, 1916 – September 14, 2001) was an American army nurse during World War II. Petty was the first Black member of the U.S. Army Nurse Corps to achieve the rank of captain. She supervised a nurse training program at Fort Huachuca, and led the first group of Black nurses sent to serve in Europe in 1945.

Early life 
Petty was born in Seattle, Washington and raised in Chicago, where she graduated from Wendell Phillips High School. She graduated from the Freedmen's Hospital School of Nursing in 1940.

Career 
Petty worked in hospitals in Virginia and New York after her training. She joined the US Army Nurse Corps in 1941. She served at Fort Bragg and then at Tuskegee, where she served under chief nurse Della H. Raney. Petty was the first Black member of the U.S. Army Nurse Corps to achieve the rank of captain. In early 1944 she was assigned to head a training center for Black nurses at Fort Huachuca, Arizona. In 1944, she led the first contingent of 63 Black American army nurses sent to serve in Europe.

Petty was also active in the National Council of Catholic Nurses.

Personal life 
Mary L. Petty gave an interview in 2001 to the Chicago Tribune, about her "mostly fond memories" of being an Army nurse; at the time she was described as "nearly blind and suffering from depression and other maladies". She died a few months later, in September 2001, aged 85 years. Her grave is in the Abraham Lincoln National Cemetery in Illinois.

References

External links 

 A photo of Petty with another Black nurse in World War II, in the Schomburg Center for Research in Black Culture, New York Public Library
 First Negro Nurses Land in England (August 21, 1944), US Signal Corps photo in the Library of Congress

American nurses
American women in World War II
People from Chicago
1916 births
2001 deaths
African-American nurses